McDaniel Robinson (July 17, 1926 – February 11, 2022) was an American football coach.  He served as the head football coach at Western Carolina University from 1956 to 1968, compiling a record of 51–67–6.  Robinson played college football as a tackle at Western Carolina from 1946 to 1949.

Robinson died in Cullowhee, North Carolina on February 11, 2022, at the age of 95.

Head coaching record

College

References

1926 births
2022 deaths
American football tackles
Western Carolina Catamounts football coaches
Western Carolina Catamounts football players
High school football coaches in South Carolina
People from McDowell County, North Carolina